Ibrány is a district in north-western part of Szabolcs-Szatmár-Bereg County. Ibrány is also the name of the town where the district seat is found. The district is located in the Northern Great Plain Statistical Region. This district is a part of Rétköz geographical region.

Geography 
Ibrány District borders with Sárospatak District and Cigánd District (Borsod-Abaúj-Zemplén County) to the north, Kisvárda District and Kemecse District to the east, Nyíregyháza District to the south and west. The number of the inhabited places in Ibrány District is 8.

Municipalities 
The district has 2 towns, 1 large village and 5 villages.
(ordered by population, as of 1 January 2013)

The bolded municipalities are cities, italics municipality is large village.

Demographics

In 2011, it had a population of 23,679 and the population density was 78/km².

Ethnicity
Besides the Hungarian majority, the main minorities are the Roma (approx. 2,500) and German (150).

Total population (2011 census): 23,679
Ethnic groups (2011 census): Identified themselves: 23,826 persons:
Hungarians: 20,973 (88.02%)
Gypsies: 2,592 (10.88%)
Others and indefinable: 261 (1.10%)
Approx. 150 persons in Ibrány District did declare more than one ethnic group at the 2011 census.

Religion
Religious adherence in the county according to 2011 census:

Reformed – 8,835;
Catholic – 7,592 (Roman Catholic – 5,575; Greek Catholic – 2,017);
Evangelical – 92;
other religions – 471;
Non-religious – 1,936; 
Atheism – 71;
Undeclared – 4,682.

Gallery

See also
List of cities and towns of Hungary

References

External links
 Postal codes of the Ibrány District

Districts in Szabolcs-Szatmár-Bereg County